Enteromius rohani is a species of ray-finned fish in the genus Enteromius.

References 
 

Endemic fauna of Angola
Enteromius
Taxa named by Jacques Pellegrin
Fish described in 1921